Journey to the Center of the Earth is a 1989 fantasy film. It was a nominal sequel to the 1988 film Alien from L.A., both of which are (very) loosely based on the 1864 novel Journey to the Center of the Earth by Jules Verne.

Plot summary
Newly hired nanny Crystina arrives in Hawaii to discover that her charge is the dog of Nimrod, a rock star. Two brothers accidentally take the dog's basket to a local cave with their sister. The group of young people get lost in a cavern while exploring a volcano. The volcano explodes and while fleeing they discover the lost city of Atlantis, at the center of the Earth. Atlantis is inhabited, and view the arrival of the group along with a separate visitor from the surface, Wanda Saknussemm, as an invasion. This leads the Atlanteans to prepare to invade the surface. The children, nanny and Saknussemm must stop the invasion and escape to the surface.

Cast
Emo Philips as Nimrod
Paul Carafotes as Richard
Jackie Bernstein as Sara
Kathy Ireland as Wanda Saknussemm
Janie du Plessis as Gen. Rykov / Shank
Nicola Cowper as Crystina
Lochner De Kock as Professor Galba
Ilan Mitchell-Smith as Bryan
Albert Maritz as Mago/Kepple/Lab Assistant
Jeff Celentano as Tola
Simon Poland as Roderman / Hairdresser
Jeremy Crutchley as Billy Foul

Production

The production of the film was noted to be troubled and was stopped when the film was about halfway completed. Two years after the filming stopped, director Albert Pyun was hired to complete the film with little budget to complete the project. Pyun brought in Ireland and decided to make the film a sequel of sorts to Alien from L.A.

Reception

Moria noted that the film was a hodgepodge and a mess. What seems to have been an attempt to do a teen age version of the Verne book ends up with little to do with the book other than the underground setting. Creature Feature gave the movie 1 out of 5 stars, calling the film a mess and something that only vaguely resembles a feature film. Common Sense Media stated that the film's "plot is absurd and at times hard to follow, the acting is bad, and the film overall looks very low-budget" but that it was appropriate for most children.

References

External links

 
 

1989 films
Films based on Journey to the Center of the Earth
Films directed by Albert Pyun
Films set in Atlantis
Films set in Hawaii
Golan-Globus films
Films produced by Menahem Golan
Films produced by Yoram Globus
1980s English-language films
American fantasy adventure films
1980s American films